Attingal is a municipality in Thiruvananthapuram metropolitan area in Thiruvananthapuram district of Kerala state, India. It was the location of the Attingal kingdom, under Travancore. It is the headquarters of Chirayinkeezhu Taluk, and the important government institutions of the taluk such as the Taluk office, court complex, office of the deputy superintendent of Police, civil station, and treasuries are situated in Attingal. It is one of the oldest municipalities of Kerala which was constituted prior to its independence in 1924. In 1914 itself Attingal Town Improvement Authority (TIA) was formed which was the term used before the municipality regulation act of 1922. Attingal is the 3rd densely populated municipality in the district.

Demographics

According to the 2011 census, Attingal has a population of 37,346. Males constitute 17,009 of the population and females 20,337. Attingal has an average literacy rate of 88.9% of the population is under the age of 6.
The town is famed for its cleanliness in recent years. The municipality has undertaken many plans which have been successful. The municipality has also achieved a couple of awards for its success.

Politics
The Attingal assembly constituency is part of Attingal (Lok Sabha constituency).

Tourism

Attingal Palace
Attingal Palace is the maternal home of the Travancore royal family. The great rulers of the kingdom, including Anizham Thirunal Marthanda Varma, were brought up in this palace situated at Kollampuzha, Attingal. 
The palace, built in stone and wood, according to Kerala architecture stands in a nearly 10-acre wide plot, a portion of which is privately owned now. The palace has four temples inside it, including the 700-year-old sanctorum that houses the Palliyara Bhagavathy. The temple of the family deity, Thiruvarattukavu Devi, is also seated in a temple inside the palace complex. 
The historically important palace, built in an 'ettukettu' structure. The temples and the palace is currently under the control of the Devaswom Board. One of the entrance gates here, ' Chavadipura', was reconstructed recently by the royal family.

Anchuthengu Fort
The historical fort of Anchuthengu is about 10 km from Attingal town and the famous Siva temple Avanavanchery Sri Indilayappan Temple is within the Attingal Municipal area.

Transport
Attingal is one of the important hubs of the Thiruvananthapuram district.
Kanyakumari-Panvel Highway(National Highway 66 (India)) along with SH 46 and SH 47 connecting the town to Kilimanoor and Nedumangadu, passes through the town.SH46 joins the Town at Alamcode and SH47 at Munumukku.
Both KSRTC and private buses have frequent services to nearby  towns like Varkala, Kilimanoor, Kallambalam, Chirayinkeezhu, Kadakkavoor, Venjarammoodu, Nedumangad, Karette, Vamanapuram, Madathara and to the cities like Trivandrum, Kollam, Ernakulam etc.
The nearest railway stations are Chirayinkeezhu Railway station(7 km) and Kadakkavoor Railway station (8 km)and Varkala railway station which is 15 km away.
Trivandrum International Airport (33 km) is the nearest airport.
Two dedicated bus depots are available in the forms of a Kerala State Road Transport Corporation(KSRTC) bus depot which is one among the 28 Main depots of KSRTC and one Private Bus Terminal, both in the heart of the town.
Currently as part of NH66 4laning Attingal Bypass is planning to construction from mamom to ayamkonam.

Notable people

 K. Chinnamma, social worker and founder of Hindu Mahila Mandiram
 Prem Nazir, film actor
 Raveendran, music composer
 Jagathy Sreekumar, film actor
 G. Venugopal, playback singer
 Kumaran Asan, poet
 Marthanda Varma, Travancore King
 Bharat Gopy, Film Actor (also producer and director)
 Murali Gopy, Film Actor (also screenwriter, author, singer, and former journalist)

Educational institutions

Educational institutions include:
 College of Engineering, Attingal
 Trivandrum International School, Edackode PO, Korani, Attingal
 Rajadhani Institute of Engineering and Technology, Nagaroor, Attingal
 Government Polytechnic college, Attingal
 Government ITI, Attingal
 Sr. Elizabeth Joel CSIEMHS School, Attingal
 Government Model Boys HS School, Attingal
 Government Girls HS School, Attingal
 DIET, Attingal

References

External links
 Remaining Date for Attingal Municipality Election 2020
 Tourism Routes & Locations

Cities and towns in Thiruvananthapuram district
Kingdom of Travancore